Đông Xuyên is a ward of Long Xuyên city in An Giang Province, Vietnam.

References

Communes of An Giang province
Populated places in An Giang province